Kelly or Kellie Frost may refer to:

Real people
Kelly Frost, Sr., presenter on KQMS (AM)
Kelly Frost, Jr., presenter on KQMS (AM)
Kelly Frost, actress in the TV series Oasis

Fictional characters
Kellie Frost, a character in 8 Seconds
Kelly Frost, a character in Eleventh Hour, played by Lindsay Pulsipher